William Weston (1763 – 29 August 1833) was a civil engineer who worked in England and the United States of America. For a brief period at the end of the 18th century, Weston was the pre-eminent civil engineer in the new US and worked on the Schuylkill and Susquehanna Navigation Company, the Western and Northern Inland Lock Navigation Companies in New York, the Middlesex canal in Massachusetts, the Schuylkill Permanent Bridge at Philadelphia, Pennsylvania and the Potomac navigation.

Career
William Weston is first noticed with his work on Trent Bridge, Gainsborough, between 1787 and 1791. In 1792, he sailed from Falmouth to the US to start a five-year engagement as engineer to the Schuylkill and Susquehanna Navigation Company in Pennsylvania. Among others, Weston trained (in 1794) Benjamin Wright, later chief engineer of the Erie Canal and Loammi Baldwin chief engineer of the Middlesex Canal. He returned to England in 1801, but retained his connection with the US and was a consultant to the Erie Canal Commissioners.

Biography
He was the son of Samuel Weston, the Oxford Canal engineer. He married Charlotte Whitehouse of Gainsborough, Lincolnshire, in 1792. Their daughter, Sophia, was born in Albany and later, in England, married a Staveley.<ref name=gardner>{{cite book|title=Billingsley, Brampton and Beyond ... in search of The Weston Connection|author=Pamela (Theophilus) Gardner|publisher= Matador/Troubador Publishing Ltd.|date=2010}}</ref>

Sometime after Weston returned to England, Weston commissioned a porcelain service which came to light circa'' 2005. Possible connections of William Weston to William Weston Young and Lewis Weston Dillwyn - financial backers of the potter and ceramic artist William Billingsley - were then investigated.

His notebook, donated to the Institution of Civil Engineers in London, includes, amongst other things, a diagram of "centring at Sawley Bridge", the costings of a guard lock, a diagram of a canal bridge and costings of "Gainsboro' Bridge".

Summary of works

1791 Trent Bridge, Gainsborough
1795 Schuylkill and Susquehanna Navigation Company
1798 Delaware and Schuylkill Canal
1793 Conewago Canal, Pennsylvania
1796 Middlesex Canal, Massachusetts
1796 Potomac River Locks
1798 Western Inland Lock Navigation, New York
1796 James River Canal
1801 Schuylkill River Bridge

References

External links 
An Historical Review of Waterways and Canal Construction in New York State by Henry Wayland Hill, published 1908 by the Buffalo Historical Society.
Report of the directors of the Western and Northern Inland Lock Navigation by Western Inland Lock Navigation Company, Philip John Schuyler, William Weston, Northern Inland Lock Navigation Company, published 1796, 20 pages.
 Transactions, Volume 16 by Newcomen Society (Great Britain) Published 1937, William Weston and his Contribution to Early American Engineering.
The Water-Supply of the City of New York 1658-1895 By Edward Wegmann, published 1896, 310 pages, page 9 mentions William Weston.
Engineering Legends: Great American Civil Engineers : 32 Profiles of Inspiration and Achievement by Richard Weingardt, William Weston pages 4–8. Published 2005, 165 pages.

British bridge engineers
English canal engineers
People of the Industrial Revolution
People from Oxford
1763 births
1833 deaths
British expatriates in the United States
American canal engineers